Agave vilmoriniana, sometimes misspelled vilmoriana, and popularly known as Octopus agave, is a species of agave endemic to Mexico. It is known for its untoothed arching and twisting leaves.

Taxonomy
Wild plants had been found in 1899 by Joseph Nelson Rose near Guadalajara, Jalisco.  The species was named by Alwin Berger in 1913 in honor of Maurice de Vilmorin, based on specimens collected by Leon Diguet and grown at the Jardin des Plantes in Paris.

Distribution
In nature, the octopus agave prefers the cliffs of barrancas of southern Sonora, Chihuahua, Sinaloa, Jalisco, Durango, Nayarit and Aguascalientes, typically between elevations of 600 to 1,700 meters.

Uses
Agave vilmoriniana has one of the highest concentrations of the sapogenin smilagenin, and in parts of Mexico the leaves are cut, dried, and the fibers are beaten to make them into a brush with built-in soap.

The "octopus agave" is cultivated as an ornamental plant for planting in gardens and containers.

See also

References 

vilmorinia
Endemic flora of Mexico
Flora of Sinaloa
Flora of Jalisco
Flora of Durango
Flora of Nayarit
Flora of Aguascalientes
Garden plants of North America
Drought-tolerant plants
Plants described in 1913
Taxa named by Alwin Berger